Dorcadion quadripustulatum is a species of beetle in the family Cerambycidae. It was described by Kraatz in 1873. It is known from Turkey.

References

quadripustulatum
Beetles described in 1873